Diana Carolina is a 1984 Venezuelan telenovela produced by Venevisión in association with  Wapa Televisión from Puerto Rico. Ivonne Goderich and Guillermo Dávila starred as the main characters. The theme song was Toda la luz by Guillermo Dávila.

Cast
 Ivonne Goderich
 Guillermo Dávila
 Junior Álvarez
 Millie Aviles
 Rafael José
 Corina Azopardo
 Henry Salvat
 Lucia Sanoja
 Herman O'Neill
 Flor d'Lotto
 Rene Farrait

References

External links
Intro de Novela Diana Carolina at YouTube

1984 telenovelas
Venevisión telenovelas
Venezuelan telenovelas
1984 Venezuelan television series debuts
1985 Venezuelan television series endings
Spanish-language telenovelas
Television shows set in Venezuela